The  was a bolt-action rifle of the Arisaka design used by the Imperial Japanese Army during World War II.

History

During the Second Sino-Japanese War in the 1930s, the Japanese soon found that the 7.7mm cartridge being fired by their Type 92 heavy machine gun in China was superior to the 6.5×50mm cartridge of the Type 38 rifle. This necessitated the development of a new weapon to replace the outclassed Type 38, and finally standardize on a single rifle cartridge. The Imperial Japanese Army (IJA) developed the Type 99 based on the Type 38 rifle but with a caliber of 7.7mm. The Type 99 was produced at nine different arsenals. Seven arsenals were located in Japan, with the other two located at Mukden in Manchukuo and Jinsen in Korea.

The IJA had intended to completely replace the Type 38 with the Type 99 by the end of the war. However, the outbreak of the Pacific War never allowed the army to completely replace the Type 38 and so the IJA used both rifles extensively during the war. As the war progressed, more and more cost saving steps were introduced in order to speed up production. Late war rifles are often called "last ditch" or "substitute standard" due to their crudeness of finish. They are generally as crude as the 1945 dated Mauser K98k of Germany, or worse.

The Type 99 was produced in four versions, the regular issue Type 99 short rifle, the Type 99 long rifle (a limited production variant), the take-down Type 2 paratroop rifle, and the Type 99 sniper rifle. The standard rifle also came with a wire monopod and an anti-aircraft sighting device. The Type 99 was the first mass-produced infantry rifle to have a chrome lined bore to ease cleaning. All of these features were abandoned by mid-war.

Use by other countries
During the Korean War, approximately 126,500 short and 6,650 long Type 99 rifles were re-chambered under American supervision at the Tokyo arsenal to fire the standard .30-06 Springfield cartridge. Apparently intended for the South Korean "gendarmerie", few rifles appear to have been issued at the end of the war in 1953. These rifles were fitted with lengthened magazine wells and had small notches cut in the top of the receivers to accommodate the .30-06 round's 1/3 inch greater length. Accuracy suffered, due to the difference in cartridges, rifling rate and characteristics, but they were nonetheless functional. Conversions to both .30-06 and 7.62 NATO as well 7.62 Russian have also been performed by civilians, often along with sporterising modifications.

After 1946, the Republic of China re-chambered large numbers of Type 99 rifles to fire the 8×57 IS cartridge. Indonesian forces used a large number of Type 99 rifles in the fighting against the Dutch during the Indonesian National Revolution (1945–1949), although late Japanese production was less reliable. Sniper rifles were also used. The Royal Thai Army received Japanese rifles of all types after 1945 and converted some short Type 99 rifles to fire the U.S. .30-06 cartridge during the early 1950s.

Nomenclature 
In the West, Japanese equipment is commonly referred to as "Type XX", rather than "Model XX". In the case of a firearm, "model" is a more accurate interpretation of the Shiki (式) character, but the word "type" has become well-established by collectors for decades.

Design

To gain the superior hitting power of the larger 7.7mm cartridge, several 6.5mm Type 38 rifles were modified for the new round. Although the tests proved satisfactory, the army decided that the added recoil and larger chambering for the 7.7mm cartridge would require an entirely new rifle to be built for the cartridge. It utilized a cock-on-closing action and an unusual safety mechanism, operated by pressing in the large knurled disk at the rear of the bolt with the palm of the hand and rotating it in a 1/8 clockwise turn, which is often misunderstood by Western shooters who are used to the Mauser's thumb lever safety. It featured a quick-release bolt and antiaircraft sights, as well as a sliding bolt cover and monopod. As a bolt-action rifle, the Type 99 was a very solid weapon, but as with all manually operated rifles used during World War II, they were in most close combat situations outclassed by semi-automatic rifles and submachine guns.

The Type 99 is one of the strongest military bolt-action rifles ever made, but many late-war ("last ditch") rifles used lower quality parts, and a complete lack of finish, as well as shortcuts taken to ease production. The "last ditch" rifles are usually distinguished by their crudeness: poorly finished stock, wooden buttplate, very obvious tooling marks in the metal, rudimentary sights and an unfinished bolt knob and handle. Unlike its predecessors, however, a disadvantage of the Type 99 was its increased recoil due to its lower weight combined with a heavier cartridge.

In some cases, these rifles may actually be training rifles intended for firing cartridges with a wood projectile only. The training rifles were made of mild steel and were never intended for ball ammunition. It is possible that reports of Type 99 rifles blowing up were simply the results of soldiers testing captured weapons. Unaware that they were using drill rifles, they fired ball ammunition in them with poor results and possible injuries. It is possible that this may have unjustly led to the Arisaka having a reputation (at least for the last ditch rifles) for being of poor construction.

The Type 99 can be fitted with a Type 30 bayonet. The Type 30 bayonet had a very long, slender blade, and was grooved to reduce weight. The early models featured a hooked quillion. These bayonets attached to a lug under the barrel and were further stabilized by a loop that fitted around the muzzle. Unmounted, it handled like a machete.

Variants

Long rifle 
The initial production rifle of the Type 99. Made only by Nagoya Arsenal and Toyo Kogyo under Kokura Arsenal supervision. Only about 38,000 were produced, 8,000 at Nagoya and 30,000 at Toyo Kogyo between summer of 1940 and spring of 1941 when production was switched to the much more common new Type 99 short rifle of which millions were made. The long rifle was found to be more cumbersome than the short rifle, and provided only marginally better performance. Thus, it was sidelined in favor of the short rifle, which was much more practical, required less resources to produce, proving more than satisfactory.

Like the early Type 99 short rifles, these Long rifles were made with a monopod, anti-aircraft lead arms on the rear sight and a dust cover.

Short rifle 
In 1942, a Type 99 with a  barrel was designed, and became the basis for the Type 99 sniper rifle.

7.92×57mm conversions
Majority of the Type 99s were converted to fire 7.92×57mm ammo for the National Revolutionary Army.

.30-06 Springfield conversions
Majority of Type 99s used by South Korean soldiers were converted to fire .30-06 ammo. Around 133,300 of them were reported to be used.

Type 99 sniper rifle

Gallery

Availability
Though the Arisaka rifle has never been exported to the United States in great numbers, there are thousands available—most having been brought home by Marines and soldiers returning from the Pacific theater. In many cases, the imperial chrysanthemum atop the receiver has been defaced by the surrendering Japanese in order to preserve the Emperor's honor: the mark indicated that the rifle was the Emperor's personal property. 

Rifles with an intact chrysanthemum often bring a premium on the collector market, sometimes almost double the price for a like model defaced rifle. Many have been rechambered to more common calibers due to the relative scarcity of factory 7.7×58mm Arisaka; it is particularly suitable for this due to its robust action.

Users

 : Some re-chambered for the 7.92×57mm IS cartridge after 1946.
 : 7.7mm (original) and 7.92mm (modified) versions still used by Chinese militias in the 1960s.
: Used during the Indonesian National Revolution.

: Used during the Korean War.
: Captured during World War II and used by Filipino guerrillas.
: Provided to Korean Constabulary in January 1946 as service rifle by the United States Army Military Government in Korea, and also obtained from manufacturing arsenal at Incheon. The Armed Forces was equipped with 19,103 US Type 99, which chambered .30-06 Springfield, before the Korean War.
: Some were converted to the .30-06 cartridge in the early 1950s.
: Used by Viet Minh during First Indochina War

References

Bibliography
 
 
 

Bolt-action rifles of Japan
World War II infantry weapons of Japan
Military equipment introduced in the 1930s
World War II rifles